Mehmet Rüştü Başaran (born 1946/47) is a Turkish billionaire businessman, the head of Habas Industrial and Medical Gases Production Industries, one of Turkey's largest steel producers. In 2018, Mehmet Rustu Basaran ranked #1999 on the Forbes World's Billionaires list, with wealth listed at US$1.1 billion.

Habas was founded by his father Hamdi Basaran in 1956. he is the chairman and part owner of Anadolubank.

Başaran is divorced, and lives in Istanbul, Turkey.

References

1940s births
Living people
Turkish billionaires
20th-century Turkish businesspeople
21st-century Turkish businesspeople